The countries of the United Kingdom by GVA per capita sets out the gross value added per capita for each of the countries of the United Kingdom as well as separate figures for the nine English regions.

2020

2019

2018

References

See also
 Countries of the United Kingdom#Statistics
 Countries of the United Kingdom by population
 Economy of the United Kingdom
 United Kingdom budget
 List of countries by area
 Income in the United Kingdom

Economy of the United Kingdom
Nations by GDP per capita
United Kingdom geography-related lists